Pulkal is a Mandal in Sangareddy District of Telangana, India.

References

Mandals in Telangana
Sangareddy district